MUG may refer to:

 Macintosh User Group
 MUMPS User Group
 Meet-up game, a term for pick-up game
 Multi-User Game, another term for multiplayer video game
 4-methylumbelliferyl-beta-D-glucuronide, a substrate used in the GUS reporter system
 Double-stranded uracil-DNA glycosylase, an enzyme
 The Medical University of Gdańsk in Poland
 Male Un-bifurcated Garment, a technical term for men's skirts
 IATA airport code for Mulegé Airstrip, near Mulegé, Baja California Sur, Mexico

See also
Mug (disambiguation)
Mugging (disambiguation)